Revolution, also known as La sombra de Pancho Villa, (English: "Pancho Villa's Shadow") is a 1933 Mexican drama film. It was directed by Miguel Contreras Torres, who also starred in the film. The film deals with the Mexican Revolution. It is one of the first Mexican films that dealt with the revolution, and the first sound film to do so.

Plot
Doroteo, engineering student, is in love with Adelita. However, the strongman of the region, Medrano, also desires the young woman and therefore has Doroteo imprisoned. While he is in jail, his ranch is raided and burned down. In this attack, Doroteo's grandmother is killed and his sister is raped. After being released, Doroteo participates in the revolution and joins Pancho Villa. After being defeated in the Battle of Celaya, he returns home, kills Medrano and marries Adelita. Then he rejoins the revolutionary troops.

Cast
Miguel Contreras Torres as Daniel Romero aka Doroteo Villar
Luis G. Barreiro as Canuto aka Sanguijela
Manuel Tamés as Macario aka Sietevidas
Alfredo del Diestro as Medrano
Rosita Arriaga as Romero's Widow
Carmen Guerrero as Adelita
Sofía Álvarez as Valentina
Antonio R. Frausto as Pantaleón
Paquita Estrada as María
Adalberto Menéndez as Martín
Emma Roldán as Healer
Alfonso Sánchez Tello as Villista General
Ricardo Carti as Villista General
Ramón Peón as Canteeneer
Max Langler as Medrano's Minion

Production
Miguel Contreras Torres himself took part in the Mexican Revolution. He fought in the army of Venustiano Carranza. Contreras Torres not only directed and starred the film, he also wrote the script and produced it in his own production company. In the United States, the film was distributed by Columbia Pictures in 1934 without subtitles.

References

Further reading
 David E. Wilt. The Mexican Filmography 1916 through 2001. McFarland & Co Inc, Jefferson NC 2004.

External links

1933 films
1930s historical drama films
Mexican historical drama films
1930s Spanish-language films
Mexican black-and-white films
Films about Pancho Villa
Films directed by Miguel Contreras Torres
Mexican Revolution films
1933 drama films